Bernhard Ekström  (30 March 1890 – 20 June 1956) was a Swedish politician. He was a member of the Centre Party. He was a member of the Parliament of Sweden (upper chamber) from 1948.

Members of the Riksdag from the Centre Party (Sweden)
1872 births
1952 deaths
Members of the Första kammaren
People from Lessebo Municipality